The Camp Chase Railway  is a short-line switching and terminal railroad in and near Columbus, Ohio, United States, running past the former Camp Chase. Was owned by Indiana Boxcar Corporation from 2015 to 2019, and by Midwest and Bluegrass Rail since. It was previously known as Camp Chase Railroad and was owned by Carload Express, Inc. when it acquired a former New York Central Railroad line between Columbus and Lilly Chapel from Conrail in 1994. Through trackage rights, the CCRA interchanges with the Norfolk Southern Railway at Buckeye Yard.

CCRA owns three EMD GP9 engines, numbers 7042, 7076, and 7225, which are painted orange and black, with white  "Camp Chase" lettering, and an older orange and white engine, number 752 with orange "Camp Chase Railway" lettering.

History
The Columbus, Springfield and Cincinnati Railroad opened the line between Columbus and London in 1872, and it became part of the Cleveland, Cincinnati, Chicago and St. Louis Railway's (Big Four's) main line west from Columbus to St. Louis and later part of the New York Central Railroad. The Penn Central Transportation Company shifted traffic to the ex-Pennsylvania Railroad line between Columbus and London, and the portion of the old Big Four line west of Lilly Chapel was not included in Conrail in 1976. The remainder was kept as a minor branch line, the Camp Chase Industrial Track. On October 11, 1994, the new Camp Chase Industrial Railroad bought the line from Conrail.

The Camp Chase Industrial Railroad has been marketed under the name Camp Chase Railroad beginning around 2009. On September 30, 2015, Carload Express, Inc. announced that its Camp Chase Railroad Company has sold its line of railroad to Camp Chase Railway Company, LLC; a wholly owned subsidiary of Indiana Boxcar Corporation. Camp Chase Railway ("CAMY") assumed operations of the 14-mile rail line, which runs from Columbus to Lilly Chapel, Ohio, beginning on Thursday October 1, 2015. Most of CAMY freight revenue comes from grain being transported along the rails going either to some of the grain elevators along the track, or to be interchanged with NS at the Buckeye Yard. The Camp Chase Railroad was featured on the COLUMBUS NEIGHBORHOODS Columbus' Railroad History on November 16, 2017.

Camp Chase was One of four shortlines bought by Midwest & Bluegrass Rail LLC of Kansas City in September 2020 <https://www.progressiverailroading.com/short_lines_regionals/news/Midwest-Bluegrass-Rail-acquires-four-short-lines--61507>

See also

 Camp Chase
 Camp Chase Trail

References

External links
Camp Chase Railway - Indiana Boxcar
Camp Chase Railway - Midwest & Bluegrass Rail

Ohio railroads
Railway companies established in 1994
Switching and terminal railroads
Spin-offs of Conrail
1994 establishments in Ohio